Novak Djokovic was the defending champion, but retired trailing 4-6 in the quarterfinals against Filip Krajinović.
Sam Querrey won in the final 3–6, 7–6(7–4), 6–4 against John Isner.

Seeds
The first four seeds gets a first-round bye.

Draw

Finals

Top half

Bottom half

References
Main Draw
Qualifying Singles

Serbia Open - Singles
Serbia Open